Kılıç is a small village in the Anamur district of Mersin Province, Turkey. The population of Kılıç is only 50  as of 2011.

History 

Kılıç corresponds to the ancient city of Binda in the Roman province of Pisidia. It was the seat of a bishopric, a suffragan of the metropolitan see of Antioch of Pisidia, the capital of the province. The episcopal see is not mentioned in the Notitiae Episcopatuum of Pseudo-Epiphanius, which can be dated to 640, but appears in that attributed to Byzantine Emperor Leo VI the Isaurian.

Three bishops of the see are known through their participation in church councils. Theodorus was at the Trullan Council of 692. At the Council of Constantinople (879) there were two bishops of Binda, Stephanus and Paulus, perhaps, as in other cases, one ordained by Patriarch Ignatius of Constantinople, the other by Photius. No longer a residential bishopric, Binda is today listed by the Catholic Church as a titular see.

References

Villages in Anamur District